Khader Yousef Abu Hammad (born 6 October 1984) is a Palestinian footballer playing for Tarji Wadi Al-Nes of the West Bank Premier League as a midfielder.

He received his first national team cap for Palestine in 2008 against Jordan in the first FIFA-sanctioned match held in Palestine since the 1930s. He has since played for Palestine at the 2010 West Asian Football Federation Championship, the qualifying rounds of the 2010 Challenge Cup, 2012 AFC Challenge Cup, and in 2014 World Cup qualifying.

International career

International goals
Scores and results list Palestine's goal tally first.

References

External links

1984 births
Living people
Palestinian footballers
Palestine international footballers
Taraji Wadi Al-Nes players
Al-Faisaly SC players
West Bank Premier League players
Palestinian expatriate footballers
Palestinian expatriate sportspeople in Jordan
Association football midfielders
2015 AFC Asian Cup players